The 2008–09 season was the 101st season in the existence of Real Betis and the club's eighth consecutive season in the top flight of Spanish football. In addition to the domestic league, Real Betis participated in this season's edition of the Copa del Rey.

Players

First-team squad

**
 

 * Also holds  Brazilian citizenship.

Loaned players

Transfers

Pre-season and friendlies

Competitions

Overall record

La Liga

League table

Results summary

Results by round

Matches
The league fixtures were announced on 16 July 2008.

Copa del Rey

Round of 32

Round of 16

Quarter-finals

References

Real Betis seasons
Real Betis